The Springvale Formation is a geologic formation in Trinidad and Tobago. It preserves fossils dating back to the Late Miocene period.

Fossil content 
Among others, the formation has provided fossils of:
 Hindsiclava consors
 Plagioscion ultimus

See also 
 List of fossiliferous stratigraphic units in Trinidad and Tobago

References

Bibliography 
 

Geologic formations of Trinidad and Tobago
Neogene Trinidad and Tobago
Paleontology in Trinidad and Tobago
Shale formations
Sandstone formations
Shallow marine deposits